Singal Station is a subway station of the Bundang Line. It was opened in December 2011, as part of the latest southward extension of the Bundang Line.

A station on the now-abandoned, former Suryeo Line (1930–72) was also referred to by this name.

Seoul Metropolitan Subway stations
Metro stations in Yongin
Railway stations opened in 2011